Heliocopris (large dung beetles) is a genus of Scarabaeidae or scarab beetles in the superfamily Scarabaeoidea. Forty-seven of the fifty-two known species are found in Africa, but some are found in southern and southeast Asia.

Species
The genus Heliocopris includes the following species:

Heliocopris alatus Felsche, 1910
Heliocopris anadematus Gillet, 1908
Heliocopris andersoni Bates, 1868
Heliocopris anguliceps Janssens, 1943
Heliocopris antenor (Olivier, 1789)
Heliocopris ares Philippe, Minetti, 2022
Heliocopris atropos Boheman, 1860
Heliocopris beccarii Harold, 1871
Heliocopris biimpressus Kolbe, 1893
Heliocopris bucephalus (Fabricius, 1775)
Heliocopris camerunus Pokorny & Zidek, 2009
Heliocopris colossus Bates, 1868
Heliocopris corniculatus Janssens, 1939
Heliocopris coronatus Felsche, 1901
Heliocopris cuneifer Lesne, 1906
Heliocopris densissa Roth, 1851
Heliocopris dianae Hope, 1842
Heliocopris dilloni Guérin-Méneville, 1847
Heliocopris dolosus Janssens, 1939
Heliocopris dominus Bates, 1868
Heliocopris erycoides Felsche, 1907
Heliocopris eryx (Fabricius, 1801)
Heliocopris faunus Boheman, 1857
Heliocopris felschei Kolbe, 1904
Heliocopris fonsecai Ferreira, 1967
Heliocopris furcithorax Müller, 1941
Heliocopris gigas (Linnaeus, 1758)
Heliocopris hamadryas (Fabricius, 1775)
Heliocopris hamifer Harold, 1878
Heliocopris haroldi Kolbe, 1893
Heliocopris helleri Felsche,  1907
Heliocopris hermes Gillet, 1911
Heliocopris hunteri Waterhouse, 1891
Heliocopris japetus Klug, 1855
Heliocopris kolbei Felsche, 1901
Heliocopris marshalli Péringuey, 1901
Heliocopris midas (Fabricius, 1775)
Heliocopris mimus Janssens, 1939
Heliocopris minos Gillet, 1907
Heliocopris mutabilis Kolbe, 1893
Heliocopris myrmidon Kolbe, 1893
Heliocopris neptuniformis Felsche, 1907
Heliocopris neptunoides Janssens, 1939
Heliocopris neptunus Boheman, 1857
Heliocopris pauliani Janssens, 1939
Heliocopris pirmal (Fabricius, 1798)
Heliocopris quinqueangulatus Janssens, 1939
Heliocopris samson Harold, 1878
Heliocopris sirius Gillet, 1925
Heliocopris solitarius Kolbe, 1893
Heliocopris staudingeri Kolbe, 1893
Heliocopris sylvanus Gillet, 1925
Heliocopris tyrannus Thomson, 1859

Notes

Further reading
 Pokorný, Svatopluk; Zídek, Jiří and Werner, Karl (2009) Giant dung beetles of the genus Heliocopris (Scarabaeidae) Taita Publishers, Hradec Králové, Czech Republic,